Liburuklik (est. 2011) is a digital library of publications related to the Basque. The Basque Government oversees the project.

References

External links
 Official site
 

Basque culture
Spanish digital libraries
Internet properties established in 2011
Basque-language websites